In mathematics, Palais theorem, named after Richard Palais, may refer to:

Lie–Palais theorem about vector fields
Mostow–Palais theorem
Morse–Palais lemma